Two Ocean Lake is located in Grand Teton National Park, in the U. S. state of Wyoming. The larger Emma Matilda Lake is one mile (1.6 km) to the south.

Two Ocean Lake only flows into Pacific Creek so the name is a misnomer.

See also
Geology of the Grand Teton area

References

Lakes of Grand Teton National Park
Lakes of Teton County, Wyoming